Carl O. Jorgenson (June 6, 1881 – October 19, 1951) was a North Dakota public servant and politician with the Republican Party who served as the North Dakota State Auditor from 1913 to 1916. After serving two terms, he was defeated in the 1916 Republican Primary and therefore did not run again for the office.

Biography
Carl Jorgenson was born in Willmar, Minnesota. He was one of three children born to Ole B. Jorgenson and  Jennie (Olson) Jorgenson, both of whom were immigrants from Norway. He came to Milnor, North Dakota with his parents in 1885. He was educated at Milnor High School, and later took courses at a business college in Minneapolis, Minnesota. He served in various capacities in the office of the Auditor beginning in 1901, and was elected to the position of State Auditor in 1912. He served until he lost his party's primary in 1916. He died at the age of 70 in Fargo, North Dakota. He was buried at the Milnor Lutheran Cemetery in Sargent County, North Dakota.

References

1881 births
1951 deaths
North Dakota State Auditors
People from Willmar, Minnesota
People from Sargent County, North Dakota
North Dakota Republicans
20th-century American politicians
American Lutherans
American people of Norwegian descent
20th-century Lutherans